Hamilton West can refer to any of several different places, people, or things:

Places
In Canada
Hamilton West (federal electoral district)
Hamilton West (provincial electoral district)
Hamilton West—Ancaster—Dundas (federal electoral district)
Hamilton West—Ancaster—Dundas (provincial electoral district)

In New Zealand
Hamilton West, New Zealand, suburb of Hamilton
Hamilton West (New Zealand electorate)

In Scotland
Hamilton West and Earnock (ward), electoral ward
Hamilton West, Hamilton, Scotland, neighbourhood
Rutherglen and Hamilton West (UK Parliament constituency)

People
E. Hamilton West, bishop in The Episcopal Church
Hamilton West (Nicaraguan footballer), Nicaraguan footballer

Other
Hamilton West (football club), Scottish association football club
Hamilton West railway station, Scotland
Hamilton West School, New Zealand